Chin Ka-lok, sometimes credited as Chin Kar-lok (Chinese: 錢嘉樂, Pinyin: Qián Jiālè, born 6 August 1965), is a Hong Kong actor, action choreographer, and television presenter.

Chin was born in Hong Kong, the younger brother of actor and stunt performer Chin Siu Ho. He is a former member of Sammo Hung's stunt team. Chin began working as a stuntman at the age of 16.

In 1985, he made his film debut in Sammo Hung's Heart of Dragon as one of Jackie Chan's SWAT Team buddies. In 1988, Chin replaced his brother Siu Ho in the 4th installment of Mr. Vampire. After starring in The Green Hornet and Drunken Master II in 1994, he began doing non-action roles alongside action roles. In 1995, he played a demon destroyer/centipede demon/scholar in Journey to the West. In 1997, he directed his only film, 97 Aces Go Places.

Aside from films, he is the co-host of The Super Trio Show, a Hong Kong variety show, along with Jerry Lamb and Eric Tsang.

As a fan of cars and racing, he starred in a comedic short as a street racer/drifter. However, when he took part in a 2005 TVB telethon, he performed donuts in the same 350Z as seen in the film with Lee San San standing in the center as a cone. Then in 2003 he starred the film Star Runner as "Senior Ho", a veteran fighter for the team Kong Ching.

Filmography

Film

Gang of Four (1978)
Island of Virgins (1978)
Leung mooi zai (1982)
The 82 Tenants (1982)
Man tian shen fo (1983)
Fast Fingers (1983)
Project A (1983) as Coast Policeman
Shen yong shuang xiang pao (1984) as Sha's Thug
Hong Kong 1941 (1984) as Minor Role
Wheels on Meals (1984) as Motorcycle Punk (uncredited)
The Owl vs Bombo (1984) as Thug in Alley
My Lucky Stars (1985) as Gang Thug
Mr. Boo Meets Pom Pom (1985) as Cop
Those Merry Souls (1985) as Beach Thug
Twinkle, Twinkle, Lucky Stars (1985) as Warehouse Thug #1 / Thai Assassin #2
Heart of Dragon (1985) as SWAT Team Member / Log
Ghost Festival (1985)
Yes, Madam (1985) as Tin's Thug
Righting Wrongs (1986)
Millionaires Express (1986) as Kar Lok
Sworn Brothers (1987) as Ka-lok
Eastern Condors (1987) as Nguyen Siu-tran
Paper Marriage (1988) as Whits Suit's Thug
Dragons Forever (1988) as Bar Thug (uncredited)
Three Against the World (1988) as Ming
Mr. Vampire IV (1988) as Chia-Lok
The Banquet (1991)
Bury Me High (1991) as Wisely
The Tantana (1991) as Dragon
Swordsman II (1992) as Sarutobi Kazuki
Operation Scorpio (1992) as Yu Shu
Great Hero from China (1992) as Lok
Night Life Hero (1992) as Peter
Martial Arts Master Wong Fei Hung (1992) as Wong Fei Hung
Moon Warriors (1992) as 13th Prince's bodyguard
Vengeance of Six Dragons (1992) as 5th brother
Fighting Fist (1992) as Teddy Wong
Lady Killer (1992)
Once Upon a Time in China IV (1993) as Duen Tin-lui
The Avenging Quartet (1993) as Paul
Hero Dream (1993)
On Parole (1993) as Sing
We're No Heroes (1994)
Drunken Master II (1994) as Fo-sang
The Green Hornet (1994) as Dong / The Green Hornet
Kung Fu Kid (a.k.a. Shaolin Heroes) (1994) as Feng Shi-Yu a young fighter
Switch-Over (1994)
Burden of Proof (1994)
Thunderbolt (1995) as Coach's Assistant
Full Throttle (1995) as Jimmy / Ka-lok
Little Hero on the Run (1995)
Kung Fu Cop (1995)
Those Were the Days (1996)
King of Robbery (1996) as Zhong
24 Hours Ghost Story (1997) as Ah-Ah
Full Alert (1997) as Bill
My Dad Is a Jerk (1997)
Troublesome Night 2 (1997) as Chuen
Intimates (1997) as Wang Cheng
Task Force (1997) as Robber
97 Aces Go Places (1997) as Fatty's man in black
Young and Dangerous 5 (1998) as Big Head
Troublesome Night 3 (1998) as Rock
Hong Kong X-File (1998) as Miu
Hard Trail (1998)
Life Express (1998)
Troublesome Night 5 (1999) as Brother B
Fourteen Days Before Suicide (1999) as Leung Tin
Horoscope 1: The Voice from Hell (1999) as Chai
The Truth About Jane and Sam (1999) as Jane's brother
Oh! My Dad! (1999)
Hanky Panky (1999)
Last Ghost Standing (1999) as Jackie Chan
The Untold Story III (1999) as Police Station Receptionist
Watch Out (1999)
Baroness (2000)
Born to Be King (2000) as Big Head
Killers from Beijing (2000) as Wong
The King Boxer (2000)
Bruce Law Stunts (2000)
Hit Team (2001) as Chong Chin Ho
Maniacal Night (2001) as Tinkon Pan
Killing End (2001)
Let's Sing Along (2001) as Tim
The Avenging Fist (2001) as Jazz
Mo ren kuang dao (2001)
Chinese Heroes (2001) as Master Shen Way
Mou man tai 2 (2002) as Police officer
To Seduce an Enemy (2003) as Pong
City of SARS (2003)
Star Runner (2003) as "Senior" Ho
Men Suddenly in Black (2003) as Himself
Papa Loves You (2004)
Osaka Wrestling Restaurant (2004) as TV Director
One Nite in Mongkok (2004) as Brandon
Cop Unbowed (2004) as Curry
Boxer's Story (2004) as Fung
Unusual Moment (2004)
Hardrock Affairs (2004) as Liu Liang
Crazy N' the City (2005) as Carlos
It Had to Be You! (2005)
A.V. (2005) as Action Director
2 Young (2005)
Drink-Drank-Drunk (2005) as Big Bear
The Sentiment Confuses: The Cuttlefish (2005)
Great Heart (2005)
My Kung-Fu Sweetheart (2006)
Bet to Basic (2006) as Flying Dragon
Half Twin (2006)
Feel It Say It... (2006)
Undying Heart (2006) as Chung
Dancing Lion (2007) as TV producer
Lust, Caution (2007) as Tsao
Beauty and the 7 Beasts (2007) as Preacher
Vampire Super (2007) as Song Ren He
Shinjuku Incident (2009) as Hongkie
Murderer (2009) as Andy
Kungfu Cyborg (2009) as Xu Dachun 
Fortune King Is Coming to Town! (2010)
72 Tenants of Prosperity (2010)
Bruce Lee, My Brother (2010) as Shek Kin
I Love Hong Kong 2012 (2012) as Citizen
The Bullet Vanishes (2012) as Wu ZhongGuo
Cold War (2012) as Vincent Tsui
Golden Chicken 3 (2014) as Businessman Whoremaster
Overheard 3 (2014) as Yuen
Break Up 100 (2014)
Keeper of Darkness (2015)
Special Female Force (2016) as Big Head
Golden Job (2018) as Dan Ding
The Goldfinger (TBD)

TVB series

TVB Host

References

External links

 

1965 births
Living people
TVB veteran actors
Action choreographers
Hong Kong male film actors
Hong Kong male television actors
20th-century Hong Kong male actors
21st-century Hong Kong male actors